Lonicera reticulata, commonly called grape honeysuckle, is a species of honeysuckle that is native to North America.

It is a perennial vine that produces creamy white or yellow flowers that age to pink in late spring.

References

reticulata
Flora of North America
Taxa named by Constantine Samuel Rafinesque